.td is the Internet country code top-level domain (ccTLD) for Chad made available for use in 1997.

It is administered by NIC.TD and Managed by Agence de Développement des Technologies de l'Information et de la Communication.

Registrations
As of July 2017, there are 876 .td domains registered.

Second-level domains
Registrations are made directly at the third-level beneath second-level domains:

 .presid.td (reserved for the Presidency)
 .gouv.td (reserved for government and state entities)
 .com.td (commercial companies including financial institutions, industrial, etc)
 .org.td (non-governmental organizations, nonprofit organizations, associations)
 .nat.td (public enterprises, national institutes, national offices, national agencies)
 .tourism.td (companies operating in the field of tourism, museums, national parks)
 .info.td (entities providing information and related content, such as the press, non-fiction television and radio)
 .net.td (telecommunications operators and networks)
 .sante.td (health establishments, such as hospitals, dispensaries, etc.)
 .edu.td (educational institutions)
 .agri.td (structure of the Ministry of Agriculture, research establishment)
 .ordr.td (professional orders)

See also
 Internet in Chad

References

External links
 IANA .td whois information
 Internet Society - Chad
 .td Network Information Center (another website)

Science and technology in Chad
Country code top-level domains
Communications in Chad

sv:Toppdomän#T